Dončić is a Serbo-Croatian surname. It is spelled as Dončič in Slovenia. It may refer to:

 Danilo Dončić (born 1969), Serbian football manager
 Luka Dončić (born 1999), Slovenian basketball player
 Saša Dončić (born 1974), Slovenian basketball coach and former player
 Siniša Hajdaš Dončić (born 1974), Croatian politician

Croatian surnames
Serbian surnames
Slovene-language surnames